Lucas Oliveira Rosa (born 3 April 2000) is a Brazilian professional footballer who plays as a defender for Spanish club Real Valladolid. Mainly a right-back, he has been deployed as a right wing-back and a left-back on occasion.

Internationally, Lucas played for his native Brazil at under-17 level.

Club career
Born in Ribeirão Preto, São Paulo, Lucas played for local Vale Sports, Taubaté and Palmeiras' youth categories over his formation in his birthplace.

In April 2018, Lucas joined Italian side Juventus, where he finished his formation and got promoted to the Under-23 team. He made his debut in the competition on 30 March 2019, coming on as a second-half substitute for Luca Zanimacchia in a 4–0 defeat against Pistoiese.

In his first professional experience, the defender played 19 league matches for the club in Serie C, the third level of the Italian football league system, before the tournament be stopped by the Italian government due to the coronavirus pandemic.

On 27 May 2021, Rosa signed a four-year contract with Spanish club Real Valladolid, being initially assigned to the reserves.

International career
Lucas was born in Brazil, and is of Italian descent. As he was granted Italian citizenship, Lucas Rosa is also eligible to be called up to the Italy national team. Lucas represented Brazil at under-17 level during the preparation for the 2017 South American U-17 Championship.

Career statistics

Club

Honours 
Juventus U23
 Coppa Italia Serie C: 2019–20

References

External links

2000 births
Living people
Brazilian footballers
Brazil youth international footballers
Brazilian people of Italian descent
Brazilian expatriate footballers
Association football defenders
Serie C players
La Liga players
Segunda Federación players
Primera Federación players
Sociedade Esportiva Palmeiras players
Juventus F.C. players
Juventus Next Gen players
Real Valladolid Promesas players
Real Valladolid players
Brazilian expatriate sportspeople in Spain
Expatriate footballers in Spain
People from Ribeirão Preto
Footballers from São Paulo (state)